Home at Seven is a 1952 British mystery drama film directed by and starring Ralph Richardson. It also features Margaret Leighton, Jack Hawkins, Campbell Singer and Michael Shepley. It is based on the 1950 play Home at Seven by R. C. Sherriff. It was shot at Shepperton Studios with sets designed by the art directors Vincent Korda and Frederick Pusey. The film is Richardson's only work as director. Guy Hamilton was assistant director. It was released on DVD in the UK on 30 June 2014 by Network Distributing.

Plot
Preston, a City of London banker, returns at 7 pm to his suburban home in Kent one Tuesday evening to discover that he has been missing for 24 hours, yet he does not remember the lost day. He discovers that he was seen at the social club which he is the treasurer of on Monday evening taking 515 pounds from the safe. The man who saw this, Robinson, is found murdered in an allotment the evening he comes home.

When questioned by the police he lies that he spent the night across London with friends. However he later discovers the friend he nominated is away on holidays.

He goes to his doctor and tells him he has started to remember things. He describes where Robinson was found and how he was being followed by him. He says he buried the money then followed Robinson. He tells the doctor of his lie about where he was Monday night.

His doctor takes him to see his solicitor who advises him to employ an expensive counsel to defend himself. The solicitor also advises him to tell the police the correct story. He becomes the major suspect in the robbery and murder, but he does not know if he was involved or not.

The police takes him to the police station for a statement after collecting his clothes and shoes worn on Monday. Preston's wife reveals to the lawyer that her husband has been short of money due to his father embezzling money from his work.

He tells the police that he cannot remember anything from 6 pm Monday till 7 pm Tuesday. The president of the club tells the doctor that Preston has been borrowing money all around the club.

It is ultimately revealed by a barmaid that he regularly spends from 5pm till 6 pm each evening in her pub. He did this on Monday evening but started acting oddly following a loud bang outside, which seemed to trigger a war time memory. He seemed to think the war is back on. He then is placed in a room in the hotel and he goes to sleep. He sleeps there all night and in the morning still seems to think the war is on. He stayed in the room all day. They take him down to the bar at 5 pm and he comes out if the trance, says he is going home, and leaves. She tells the police and they advise Preston they have discovered Robinson and another person did the robbery and he murdered Robinson.

Cast
 Ralph Richardson as David Preston 
 Margaret Leighton as Janet Preston
 Jack Hawkins as Dr Sparling 
 Campbell Singer as Inspector Hemingway 
 Michael Shepley as Major Watson 
 Margaret Withers as Mrs Watson 
 Meriel Forbes as Peggy Dobson 
 Frederick Piper as Petherbridge 
 Gerald Case as Sergeant Evans
 Diana Beaumont as Ellen
 Archie Duncan as station sergeant 
 Victor Hagan as police photographer 
 Robert Moore as fingerprint man 
 Johnnie Schofield as Joe Dobson, landlord of the Feathers

Production
Sidney Gilliat claims Alex Korda directed the film. He called Home at Seven "a very bad play which Alex made a very bad picture out of; but he skilfully gave the directing credit to Ralph Richardson.

Critical reception
Variety stated that "Richardson directs the piece with a straightforward competence." Sight & Sound was more critical: Richardson had "divided his talent between the principal role and the direction, but the latter is practically non-existent in any cinema sense".

References

External links

1952 films
1950s mystery drama films
British mystery drama films
British black-and-white films
British films based on plays
London Films films
British Lion Films films
Films directed by Ralph Richardson
Films with screenplays by Anatole de Grunwald
1952 drama films
Films about amnesia
Films set in London
Films shot at Shepperton Studios
1950s English-language films
1950s British films